Ivan Semedi (1921–2008) was bishop of the Eparchy of Mukacheve from 1983 to 2002.

Life
Ivan Semedi was born in Mala Kopanya on 21 June 1921. He was ordained a Priest at the age of 26. On 24 August 1978 he was consecrated bishop of Mukacheve, Ukraine. He held the post for 24 years until he retired in 2002. He was succeeded by Milan Šašik.

He died on 6 December 2008.

Notes

1921 births
2008 deaths
20th-century Roman Catholic bishops in Ukraine
Ruthenian Catholic bishops
People from Zakarpattia Oblast
21st-century Roman Catholic bishops in Ukraine